Laminion is a genus of south Asian ant spiders. It was first described by P. M. Sankaran, J. T. D. Caleb and P. A. Sebastian in 2020, and it has only been found in India.

Species
 it contains 4 species:
L. arakuense (Patel & Reddy, 1989) – India
L. birenifer (Gravely, 1921) – India
L. debasrae (Biswas & Biswas, 1992) – India
L. gujaratense (Tikader & Patel, 1975) – India

See also
 List of Zodariidae species

References

Further reading

Zodariidae genera
Spiders of the Indian subcontinent